Van Groningen is a Dutch surname. Notable people with the surname include:

Barend Hartman van Groningen
Gert van Groningen, 16th century Danish sculptor
Jan Swart van Groningen ( 1495– 1563), Dutch painter
Steven van Groningen (born 1957), Dutch rower

Dutch-language surnames